"Pobre Niña Rica" is a latin pop song released by singer Paulina Rubio as the theme song from her Mexican telenovela of the same name, and later it was released in the first EP of the singer, MaxiSingle and in 1996 as a bonus track of her fourth studio album, Planeta Paulina. There are two versions of the song, the first was launched in conjunction with the launch of the telenovela in Mexico and is written by Graciella Carballo, Mario Púparo and the second was launched in early 1996 as a single airplay and is written and produced by Marco Flores.

In the Univisión television program "Aquí y Ahora" in 1995, Rubio spoke about his character as Alma Villagrán in the soap opera created by Chilean producer Valentín Pimstein, which is closely linked to the meaning of the song. She said: "It is the character of a girl who has everything material, but not everything human, the heart. And she realizes that money does not give you happiness". The song reached number 9 in Mexico City's Ballad charts.

Track listing and formats
 Mexico CD, Single, Promo

 "Pobre Niña Rica" – 4:33
 "Pobre Niña Rica" (Radio Edit) – 3:37

 USA CD, Single, Promo

 "Pobre Niña Rica" – 3:36

References

1995 singles
Paulina Rubio songs
Spanish-language songs
EMI Latin singles
Songs written by Marco Flores (songwriter)